The 2008–09 New Mexico Lobos men's basketball team represented the University of New Mexico as a member of the Mountain West Conference. The Lobos were coached by second-year head coach Steve Alford and played their home games at the University Arena, also known as "The Pit", in Albuquerque, New Mexico.

The Lobos finished the season 22–12, 12–4 in Mountain West play. They were Co–Champions of the Mountain West Conference with Utah and BYU. They were defeated by Wyoming in the semifinals of the 2009 Mountain West Conference men's basketball tournament. They invited of the 2009 National Invitation Tournament. They defeated Nebraska before losing to Notre Dame in the second round.

Roster

Rankings

2008–2009 Schedule

|-
!colspan=9| Exhibition

|-
!colspan=9| Regular season

|-
!colspan=10| 2009 MWC men's basketball tournament

|-
!colspan=10| 2009 National Invitation Tournament

References

New Mexico Lobos men's basketball seasons
New Mexico
New Mexico
2008 in sports in New Mexico
2009 in sports in New Mexico